Ezequiel Nicolás Filipetto (born 9 December 1987) is an Argentine footballer who plays as a centre-back for Sportivo Estudiantes.

Career
Filipetto made his professional debut for Huracán on 13 December 2008 in a 3-0 home win against Vélez Sarsfield. During the Apertura 2009 tournament he became a regular first team player and scored his first goal for the club on 3 October 2009 against Racing.

External links
 
 BDFA profile 
 Argentine Primera statistics at Futbol XXI  
 

1987 births
Living people
Sportspeople from Buenos Aires Province
Argentine footballers
Argentine expatriate footballers
Association football defenders
Club Atlético Huracán footballers
CS Pandurii Târgu Jiu players
Club Almirante Brown footballers
Universitario de Sucre footballers
C.D. Cuenca footballers
Zamora FC players
Club Atlético Alvarado players
Barracas Central players
San Telmo footballers
Club Sportivo Estudiantes players
Argentine Primera División players
Primera Nacional players
Bolivian Primera División players
Liga I players
Ecuadorian Serie A players
Venezuelan Primera División players
Primera B Metropolitana players
Torneo Federal A players
Argentine expatriate sportspeople in Bolivia
Argentine expatriate sportspeople in Romania
Argentine expatriate sportspeople in Ecuador
Argentine expatriate sportspeople in Venezuela
Expatriate footballers in Bolivia
Expatriate footballers in Romania
Expatriate footballers in Ecuador
Expatriate footballers in Venezuela